Dolphin Cove Jamaica is a marine attraction in Jamaica at which guests can swim and interact with dolphins, sharks, and stingrays in their natural environment. Visitors may also interact with other species including iguanas, snakes and a variety of birds as well as other marine creatures in the Jungle Trail Walk.  Dolphin Cove has been the recipient of many awards.

The company operates three facilities on the island: Ocho Rios, Montego Bay, and Lucea, which is claimed to be the largest natural dolphin lagoon in the world.

History
When it opened in 2001, Dolphin Cove Ocho Rios was the first attraction of its kind in Jamaica. The second park opened in Montego Bay in 2005 at the Half Moon Resort and is reserved for guests of the resort. The third facility at Lucea opened  during 2010.

In 2015, Dolphin Discovery bought these locations, and now they are partners..

References

External links 
 dolphincoveja.com Official website

Dolphinariums
Tourist attractions in Hanover Parish
Tourist attractions in Jamaica
Tourist attractions in Saint Ann Parish
Tourist attractions in Saint James Parish, Jamaica